Erick Steven Ferigra Burnham  (born 7 February 1999) is an Ecuadorean professional footballer who plays as a centre-back for Portuguese club F.C. Paços de Ferreira.

Club career
Ferigra began his career with Kelme, then the Barcelona academy. In 2017, he moved to Italy with Fiorentina, then Torino, with Barcelona receiving 15% of the transfer fee.

Ferigra made his competitive debut for Torino on 12 August 2018 in a 4–0 home win against Cosenza in the Coppa Italia. On 5 August 2019, he joined Serie B club Ascoli on loan.

On 7 June 2021, Ferigra returned to Spain after signing a three-year contract with UD Las Palmas in Segunda División. On 23 August of the following year, he terminated his link and moved to F.C. Paços de Ferreira in Portugal.

International career
He made his national team debut on 8 October 2020 in a World Cup qualifier game against Argentina.

Personal life
Ferigra has a Spanish passport allowing him to count as an EU player.

Honours

Club
Torino
Coppa Italia Primavera: 2017–18
Supercoppa Primavera: 2018

References

External links

1999 births
Living people
Sportspeople from Guayaquil
Ecuadorian footballers
Ecuador international footballers
Spanish footballers
Ecuadorian emigrants to Spain
Association football defenders
ACF Fiorentina players
Torino F.C. players
Ascoli Calcio 1898 F.C. players
UD Las Palmas players
F.C. Paços de Ferreira players
Serie B players
Segunda División players
Ecuadorian expatriate footballers
Ecuadorian expatriate sportspeople in Italy
Ecuadorian expatriate sportspeople in Spain
Ecuadorian expatriate sportspeople in Portugal
Expatriate footballers in Italy
Expatriate footballers in Spain
Expatriate footballers in Portugal